Renincarnated is the fourth album by rapper MC Ren, released October 31, 2009, on his own record label Villain Entertainment.

The album marked MC Ren's comeback after not having released an album in eleven years since 1998's Ruthless for Life., The album was a download-only album, with no physical edition currently available. It is his first album since he declined a major label deal in 2002 off the back of a series of high-profile appearances on hit albums for Dr. Dre and Ice Cube.

Commercial performance
The album went on to sell 650 digital downloads in its first week after which it sold more than 3,000 digital copies in the US.

Track listing

Singles

"Renincarnated"
The first single from the Renincarnated album, and the first from MC Ren's label Villain Entertainment. It was on released August 11, 2009, and is his first single since "Who in the Fuck" in 1998.

"Showtime"
The second single from Renincarnated was released on November 8, 2009.

References

2009 albums
MC Ren albums
Villain Entertainment albums